Kingston City was a federal electoral district represented in the House of Commons of Canada from 1925 to 1953. It was located in the province of Ontario. This riding was created in 1924 from parts of Kingston riding.

It consisted of the city of Kingston, Ontario, and the village of Portsmouth.

The electoral district was abolished in 1952 when it was merged into Kingston riding.

Members of Parliament

This riding elected the following members of the House of Commons of Canada:

Election results

See also 

 List of Canadian federal electoral districts
 Past Canadian electoral districts

External links 
Riding history from the Library of Parliament

Former federal electoral districts of Ontario
Kingston, Ontario